Terror in the Sky is a 1971 U.S. telefilm.

Terror in the sky, terror from the skies, sky terror, or variant thereof, may refer to:

Television
 Terror in the Skies, a television show examining commercial aviation
 "Terror in the Sky" (Batman: The Animated Series), a 1992 episode, season 1, episode 45 of Batman: The Animated Series
 "Terror from the Sky", a 2009 episode from season 3 of MonsterQuest
 "Terror From the Skies", a 1974 episode, season 1, episode 6 of The Manhunter
 "Terror From the Sky", a 2003 episode, season 1, episode 2 of Martin Mystery; see List of Martin Mystery episodes

Other uses
 Terror in the Skies, a fantasy RPG book published by FASA from the Earthdawn game; see List of Earthdawn books
 "Terror from the Skies", radio episode 243 from 1993 of Adventures in Odyssey, see List of Adventures in Odyssey episodes
 Sky Terror, a 1972 film
 "Sky Terror", a 1942 film serial chapter from Captain Midnight